Friedrich Haas (20 January 1924 – 9 April 1945) was a Luftwaffe fighter ace from Dillenburg/Hesse, Germany and recipient of the Knight's Cross of the Iron Cross during World War II. Friedrich Haas was credited with 74 aerial victories all over the Eastern Front (World War II). Haas was shot down and killed in 1945 over Vienna, Austria.

Career

Haas was posted to 5. Staffel (5th squadron) of Jagdgeschwader 52 (JG 52—52nd Fighter Wing) in late 1943. He flew on 385 combat missions, scoring 74 kills over the subsequent year and a half. Haas' squadron was often outnumbered and short on fuel at this late stage of the war.

On 10 July, Haas made an emergency landing in his Messerschmitt Bf 109 G-6 (Werknummer 163574—factory number) west of Stryi and sustained injuries.

Squadron leader and death
On 1 February 1945, Haas succeeded Hauptmann Erich Hartmann as Staffelkapitän (squadron leader) of 4. Staffel of JG 52. On 1 March, this Staffel was renamed and became the 5. Staffel of JG 52. At the same time, the former 5. Staffel was also renamed and became the 6. Staffel. At the time, II. Gruppe was based at Veszprém in Hungary.

Haas was shot down over Vienna on 9 April 1945 and, though he managed to bail out from his Bf 109 G at low altitude, he struck the vertical stabilizer and fell to his death. He was posthumously awarded the Knight's Cross of the Iron Cross in April. Haas was succeeded by Leutnant Paul Linxen as commander of 5. Staffel. He is buried in Oberwölbling, Austria.

Summary of career

Aerial victory claims
According to Barbas, Obermaier and Spick, Haas was credited with 74 aerial victories claimed in 385 combat missions. Mathews and Foreman, authors of Luftwaffe Aces — Biographies and Victory Claims, researched the German Federal Archives and found records for 50 aerial victory claims recorded on the Eastern Front.

Victory claims were logged to a map-reference (PQ = Planquadrat), for example "PQ 66671". These sectors were then subdivided into 36 smaller units to give a location area 3 × 4 km in size.

Awards
 German Cross in Gold on 26 July 1944 as Unteroffizier in the 5./Jagdgeschwader 52
 Knight's Cross of the Iron Cross on 26 April 1945 as Leutnant and Staffelführer of the 5./Jagdgeschwader 52

Notes

References

Citations

Bibliography

 
 
 
 
 
 
 
 
 
 
 
 
 

1924 births
1945 deaths
Luftwaffe personnel killed in World War II
German World War II flying aces
Luftwaffe pilots
Recipients of the Gold German Cross
Recipients of the Knight's Cross of the Iron Cross
World War II prisoners of war held by the Soviet Union
Military personnel from Hesse
Aviators killed by being shot down